Goose Creek Consolidated Independent School District (GCCISD) is a school district headquartered in Baytown, Texas, United States.

The district has 16 elementary schools, 5 junior high schools (6-8), 4 high schools (9-12), a career center, and two alternative centers for education. The district serves all of Baytown, Highlands, Coady, McNair, outlying areas of East Harris County, and a small portion of West Chambers County. The district has a total enrollment of 23,765 students and 1,534 staff. The district's total actual budget for 2019-2020 is US$293.9 million.

In 2009, the school district was rated "academically acceptable" by the Texas Education Agency.

History
Goose Creek Independent School District was organized in 1919 and served the tri-cities of Pelly, Goose Creek, and Baytown. The district launched its first building program in 1921 with the passing of a $200,000 bond issue for the purchase of land and construction of five schools.

In 1938 the Highlands community, previously in Crosby ISD, joined the Goose Creek district.

Robert E. Lee High School opened in 1928 and was named in honor of Robert E. Lee, the military commander of the Confedererate Army.

In 1954, Goose Creek ISD consolidated with Cedar Bayou ISD to form Goose Creek Consolidated Independent School District (GCCISD).

GCCISD became desegregated in 1967 and George Washington Carver High School was closed.

In 2002 the district changed scheduling for all schools.

Infrastructure 
For several years of research and debate, voters passed a $120 million bond referendum in 2005 to improve present facilities, replace several existing schools, and build new ones. Included in this package is a third high school (which was included in a 1999 referendum, but never materialized) named Goose Creek Memorial that opened in Fall 2008. Additionally, Victoria Walker Elementary was opened in fall 2007, with plans for a 16th elementary to be drawn. Both new schools are situated in the north area of Baytown which has seen the most growth in recent years. Highlands Junior High and Bowie Elementary were replaced under the bond program. After the opening of Goose Creek Memorial, Lee High School will be reformatted to a smaller campus and the auxiliary campus will be converted to its original purpose as an alternative educational center. Additionally, the district added new classrooms and improved its football stadium.

GCCISD's Stallworth Stadium is the home for varsity football and soccer for GCCISD as well as for the annual Bayou Bowl. It seats approximately 16,000 fans, making it one of the largest high school sports venues in the nation.

Student demographics 
For the 2018–2019 school year the district reported a total enrollment of 23,765

Ethnicity 

 62.5% were Hispanic American/Hispanic
 18.3% were White American/White
 15.2% were African American/Black
 1.6% were Asian American/Asian

Risk factors 

 54.1% were at risk of dropping out of school
 69.3% were economically disadvantaged

Coverage area

Cities 
GCCISD covers all of the following municipalities:

 Baytown
 Highlands

Board members 
As of mid-2020, the members of the GCCISD Board of Trustees are:

 District I: Howard Sampson (Secretary)
 District II: Agustin Loredo III
 District III: Jessica Woods (President)
 District IV: Richard Clem (Assistant Secretary)
 District V: Ben Pape (Vice President)
 District VI: Tiffany Guy
 District VII: Shae Cottar

The Goose Call podcast 
In August 2020, Goose Creek CISD introduced the Goose Call audio podcast to discuss important issues in the district. The podcast is mainly discuss the COVID-19 and return to school. The Goose Call is hosted by Matthew Bolinger and Kendall David and produced by Carrie Pryor-Newman. It is available on iTunes and Podbean.

Episodes

Schools

High Schools (Grades 9-12)
5-A
 Robert E. Lee High School
 Ross S. Sterling High School
 Goose Creek Memorial High School
Non-UIL Affiliated Campuses
Impact Early College High School
Peter E. Hyland Center

Junior High Schools (Grades 6-8)
 Baytown Junior High School
 Cedar Bayou Junior High School
 Edward Franklin "E.F." Green Junior High School
 George H. Gentry Junior High School
 Highlands Junior High School (Highlands)
 Horace Mann Junior High School

Elementary Schools (Grades PK-5)Grades PK-5 Alamo Elementary School
 James Bowie Elementary School
 George Washington Carver Elementary School
 David Crockett Elementary School (2003 National Blue Ribbon School)
 Lorenzo de Zavala Elementary School
 Harlem Elementary School
 Mirabeau B. Lamar Elementary School
 San Jacinto Elementary School
 Ashbel Smith Elementary School
 William B. Travis Elementary School
 Victoria Walker Elementary School
 Johnny T. Clark Jr. Elementary School
 Dr. Antonio Banuelos Elementary School
 Stephen F. Austin Elementary SchoolGrades 2-5Highlands Elementary School (Highlands)Grades PK-1'Bonnie P. Hopper Primary School (Highlands'')

References

External links

 
 Goose Creek Schools Alumni Association

School districts in Chambers County, Texas
School districts in Harris County, Texas
Baytown, Texas
Galveston Bay Area
1919 establishments in Texas
School districts established in 1919